Joanna Pruess is a food and travel writer and a consultant to the food industry. She is the author of fourteen cookbooks including Seduced by Bacon and, most recently, Soup for Two: Small-Batch Recipes for One, Two, or a Few and Dos Caminos Tacos: 100 Recipes for Everyone's Favorite Mexican Street Food with chef Ivy Stark.

Personal life
Pruess graduated from the University of California, Berkeley, received a master's degree in English from Stanford University, and a certificate of graduate studies in French literature and arts from the Sorbonne. She also studied at Le Cordon Bleu in Paris. Pruess was the director of the Cookingstudio, a school she founded that held classes in a number of New Jersey branches of the Kings Super Markets chain, from 1982 to 1987. Her parents were Harriet and Gerald Rubens of Los Angeles, California.

Works

References

American food writers
American travel writers
American women travel writers
Living people
Writers from the Bronx
Stanford University alumni
University of California, Berkeley alumni
University of Paris alumni
Year of birth missing (living people)
21st-century American women writers
Women food writers
21st-century American non-fiction writers
20th-century American women writers
20th-century American non-fiction writers